Tamaki may refer to:

New Zealand
Tāmaki, a suburb of Auckland to the west of the Tamaki River
Tāmaki (New Zealand electorate), in Auckland
East Tāmaki, a suburb of Auckland to the east of the Tamaki River
Tamaki River, in Auckland
Tamaki Strait, between Waiheke Island and the North Island
Tāmaki isthmus, the location of the Auckland CBD and central suburbs
Auckland (Māori name)

Other countries
Tamaki, Afghanistan
Tamaki, Mie, Japan

Other uses
Tamaki (name), people